This article lists the castles and fortifications of Albania. There are a total of 158 castles and fortifications in the country that have achieved the status of monument of cultural heritage. The English equivalent for Kala in Albanian is Fortress. The latter is most fit for usage to describe many of the below structures as documented by official travel guides.

Main castles

Other castles
 Venetian Triangular Castle
 Dajti Castle
 Dorëzi Fortress
 Drisht Castle
 Kardhiq Castle
 Kratul Fortification
 Margëlliç Castle
 Paleokastra Castle
 Peqin Castle
 Persqopi Castle
 Tirana Fortress
 Gjon Boçari Castle
 Tujani Castle
 Vlora Castle
 Vokopolë Castle
 Kelcyre Castle
 Peca Castle

See also
 List of castles
 Tourism in Albania

References

Albania
Castles
Albania
Castles